Donald L. Coburn (born August 4, 1938) is an American dramatist. He won the Pulitzer Prize for Drama in 1978 for his play The Gin Game.

Coburn was born in Baltimore, Maryland to parents who divorced two years later. He graduated from high school in 1957, then served in the U.S. Navy from 1958 to 1960. He has been married twice, first to Nazle Joyce French, whom he married in 1964 and divorced in 1971, then to Marsha Woodruff Maher in 1975. He had his own advertising company from 1965 to 1968. He then worked for the Stanford Advertising Agency in Dallas, Texas from 1968 to 1971. He worked as a marketing consultant from 1973 to 1976.

References

 http://www.bookrags.com/studyguide-gin-game/bio.html
 Contemporary Authors Online, Gale, 2008. Reproduced in Biography Resource Center. Farmington Hills, Mich.: Gale, 2008. Galenet. Document Number: H1000019020. Online. May 30, 2008.

External links
  

1938 births
Living people
Pulitzer Prize for Drama winners
20th-century American dramatists and playwrights
Writers from Baltimore